Andrés Aylwin Azócar (20 June 1925 – 20 August 2018) was a Chilean lawyer, activist and politician who served as a Deputy representing the Christian Democratic Party from 1965 to 1973 and from 1990 to 1998. His older brother was Patricio Aylwin.

Activities 
During the military dictatorship (1973–1990) Andrés Aylwin defended many of victims  arrested by the government of Augusto Pinochet.

Andre Aylwin wrote a few books including, "Simply what i saw" and " Eight days of a relegated".

References

1925 births
2018 deaths
People from Viña del Mar
Aylwin family
Chilean people of Welsh descent
Chilean Roman Catholics
Christian Democratic Party (Chile) politicians
Deputies of the XLV Legislative Period of the National Congress of Chile
Deputies of the XLVI Legislative Period of the National Congress of Chile
Deputies of the XLVII Legislative Period of the National Congress of Chile
Deputies of the XLVIII Legislative Period of the National Congress of Chile
Deputies of the XLIX Legislative Period of the National Congress of Chile
Chilean human rights activists
20th-century Chilean lawyers
University of Chile alumni